Mpendo is an administrative ward in the Chemba District of the Dodoma Region of Tanzania. In 2016 the Tanzania National Bureau of Statistics report there were 7,605 people in the ward, from 6,997 in 2012.

References

Wards of Dodoma Region